Halil İbrahim Özsoy (1938 – 14 August 2018) is a Turkish politician. He served as the Minister of Health between 1997 and 1999.

He graduated from Ege University's Faculty of Medicine. He was a specialist in mental and neurological sciences. He was the Chief Medical Officer of Afyon State Hospital. Özsoy served as deputy from Afyon in the 19th, 20th and 21st parliamentary periods. He was married and had three children. He was the Chairman of the Motherland Party. He struggled with cancer for 3 years before he died.

References 

1938 births
2018 deaths
Motherland Party (Turkey) politicians
Ege University alumni
Health ministers of Turkey
Members of the 19th Parliament of Turkey
Members of the 20th Parliament of Turkey
Members of the 21st Parliament of Turkey
Members of the 55th government of Turkey